Veronika Vojtová (born 7 February 1990) is a Czech slalom canoeist who has competed at the international level since 2007.

She won six medals at the ICF Canoe Slalom World Championships with two golds (Extreme K1: 2019, K1 team: 2015), one silver (K1 team: 2019) and three bronzes (Mixed C2: 2017, 2018, 2019). She also won two gold and three bronze medals at the European Championships.

Her partner in the mixed C2 boat is Jan Mašek.

World Cup individual podiums

1 World Championship counting for World Cup points

References

External links

Czech female canoeists
Living people
1990 births
Canoeists from Prague
Medalists at the ICF Canoe Slalom World Championships